Simon David Lewis OBE (born 8 May 1959) is the former chief executive of the Association for Financial Markets in Europe. He was formerly Director of Communications for the former Labour Prime Minister Gordon Brown. He previously held this position for the Queen, Vodafone, and Centrica. He attended Whitefield School before studying PPE at Brasenose College, Oxford.

Lewis was appointed an OBE in the 2014 New Year Honours List for public service and services to international education through the Fulbright Commission.

His brother is former Telegraph editor-in-chief, Will Lewis.

Career history 
Lewis has held down a number of positions. 
 September 2010 Chief executive of the Association for Financial Markets in Europe 
 2009 Downing Street Director of Communications 
 2004 Group director of corporate affairs, Vodafone 
 2004 Director of comms and public policy, Centrica
 2000 MD Europe, Centrica
 1998 Communications secretary to The Queen (secondment) 
 1996 Director of corporate affairs, British Gas/Centrica
 1992 Director of corporate affairs, NatWest
 1987 Head of PR, SG Warburg & Co
 1986 Head of PR, Social Democratic Party (UK)

References 

1959 births
Living people
British political consultants
British chief executives
Alumni of Brasenose College, Oxford
Officers of the Order of the British Empire